Eugene Rossiter is the Chief Justice of the Tax Court of Canada. He took office on November 23, 2006.

References

Living people
Year of birth missing (living people)
Place of birth missing (living people)
Schulich School of Law alumni
Judges of the Tax Court of Canada
21st-century Canadian judges